The Gros Ventre (meaning "big belly"), also known as the Aaniiih, A'aninin, Haaninin, Atsina, and White Clay, are a historically Algonquian-speaking Native American tribe located in north central Montana. Today the Gros Ventre people are enrolled in the Fort Belknap Indian Community of the Fort Belknap Reservation of Montana, a federally recognized tribe with 3,682 enrolled members, that also includes Assiniboine people or Nakoda people, the Gros Ventre's historical enemies.  The Fort Belknap Indian Reservation is in the northernmost part of Montana, just south of the small town of Harlem, Montana.
Chiefs: The Belly Government Council

Name
The tribal self-name  (adapted as A'aninin, Aaniiih, or Haaninin) means "White Clay People".

The French used the term Gros Ventre, which was mistakenly interpreted from their sign language. They were once known as the Gros Ventres of the Prairies, while the Hidatsa people were once called the Gros Ventres of the Missouri.

The Piegan Blackfoot, enemies of the Gros Ventre throughout most of history, called the Aaniiih Piksííksiinaa, which translates as "snakes". According to the Piegan Institute, the contemporary Blackfoot name for the Gros Ventre is Assinee meaning "big bellies", similar to the falsely translated label applied by the French. Atsina, possibly the same Blackfoot word in another dialect, is said to translate to either "gut people" or "like a Cree". The word used by all Blackfoot-speaking tribes for "Cree" is Assinaa, making this etymology more likely, but further clarification of the name is required. After the division of peoples, their relations the Arapaho, who considered them inferior, called them , meaning "beggars". Other interpretations of the term have been "hunger", "waterfall", and "big bellies".

History
The Gros Ventres are believed to have lived in the western Great Lakes region 3000 years ago, where they lived an agrarian lifestyle, cultivating maize. With the ancestors of the Arapaho, they formed a single, large Algonquian-speaking people who lived along the Red River valley in northern present-day Minnesota and in Manitoba, Canada. They were closely associated with the ancestors of the Cheyenne. They spoke the now nearly extinct Gros Ventre language (Atsina), a similar Plains Algonquian language like their kin the Arapaho and grouped therefore as an Arapahoan language (Arapaho-Atsina). There is evidence that, together with bands of Northern Arapaho, a southern tribal group, the Staetan, spoke the Besawunena dialect, which had speakers among the Northern Arapaho as recently as the late 1920s.

18th century
In the early 18th century, the large tribe split into two, forming the Gros Ventres and the Arapaho. These, with the Cheyenne, were among the last to migrate into Montana, due to pressure from the Ojibwe. After they migrated to Montana, the Arapaho moved southwards to the Wyoming and Colorado area. The Cheyenne who migrated with the Gros Ventre and Arapaho also migrated onwards. The Gros Ventres were reported living in two north–south tribal groups – the so-called Fall Indians (Canadian or northern group, Hahá-tonwan) of 260 tipis (2,500 population) traded with the North West Company on the Upper Saskatchewan River and roamed between the Missouri and Bow River, and the so-called Staetan tribe (American or southern group) of 40 tipis (400 population) living in close contact with bands (which would become the later Northern Arapaho) and roamed the headwaters of the Loup branch of the North Platte River (Lewis and Clark 1806).

The Gros Ventres acquired horses in the mid-18th century. The earliest known contact of Gros Ventres with settlers was around 1754, between the north and south forks of the Saskatchewan River. Exposure to smallpox severely reduced their numbers about this time. Around 1793, in response to attacks by well-armed Cree and Assiniboines, large groups of Gros Ventres burned two Hudson's Bay Company trading posts that were providing guns to the Cree and Assiniboine tribes in what is now Saskatchewan.

19th century

In 1832, the Gros Ventres made contact with the German explorer and naturalist, Prince Maximilian. Along with the naturalist painter Karl Bodmer, the Europeans painted portraits and recorded their meeting with the Gros Ventres, near the Missouri River in Montana.

The Gros Ventres joined the Blackfoot Confederacy. After allying with the Blackfoot, the Gros Ventres moved to north-central Montana and southern Canada. In 1855, Isaac Stevens, Governor of the Washington Territory, concluded a treaty (Stat., L., XI, 657) to provide peace between the United States and the Blackfoot, Flathead and Nez Perce tribes. The Gros Ventres signed the treaty as part of the Blackfoot Confederacy, whose territory near the Three Fork area became a common hunting ground for the Flathead, Nez Perce, Kootenai, and Crow Indians. A common hunting ground north of the Missouri River on the Fort Peck Indian Reservation included the Assiniboine and Sioux. In 1861, the Gros Ventres left the Blackfoot Confederacy.

Allying with the Crow, the Gros Ventres fought the Blackfoot but in 1867, they were defeated.

In 1868, the United States government established a trading post called Fort Browning near the mouth of Peoples Creek on the Milk River. This trading post was built for the Gros Ventres and Assiniboines, but because it was on a favorite hunting ground of the Sioux, it was abandoned in 1871. The government then built Fort Belknap, which was established on the south side of the Milk River, about one mile southwest of the present town site of Harlem, Montana. Fort Belknap was a substation post, with half of the structure being a trading post. A block house stood to the left of the stockade gate. At the right was a warehouse and an issue building, where the tribe received their rations and annuity goods.

In 1876, the fort was discontinued and the Gros Ventre and Assiniboine people receiving annuities at the post were instructed to go to the agency at Fort Peck and Wolf Point. The Assiniboines did not object to going to Wolf Point and readily went about moving; but the Gros Ventres refused to go. If they did, they would come into contact with the Sioux, with whom they could not ride together in peace. They forfeited their annuities rather than move to Fort Peck. In 1878, the Fort Belknap Agency was re-established, and the Gros Ventres, and remaining Assiniboines were again allowed to receive supplies at Fort Belknap.

White Eagle, "the last major Chief of the Gros Ventre people", died "at the mouth of the Judith River" on February 9, 1881.

In 1884, gold was discovered in the Little Rocky Mountains. Pressure from miners and mining companies forced the tribes to cede sections of the mountains in 1885. Jesuits came to Fort Belknap in 1862 to convert the Gros Ventre people to Roman Catholicism. In 1887, St. Paul's Mission was established at the foot of the Little Rocky Mountains, near Hays. Much of the traditional ceremonies were lost through the course of time following the establishment of the mission. However, the two sacred pipes, The Feathered Pipe and The Flat Pipe, remain central to the traditional spiritual beliefs of the Gros Ventres.

In 1888, at this site, the Fort Belknap Indian Reservation was established. By an act of Congress on May 1, 1888, (Stat., L., XXV, 113), the Blackfoot, Gros Ventre, and Assiniboine tribes ceded 17,500,000 acres of their joint reservation and agreed to live on three smaller reservations. These are now known as the Blackfoot Confederacy, the Fort Peck Indian Reservation and the Fort Belknap Indian Reservation. Fort Belknap was named for William W. Belknap, who was Secretary of War at that time.

20th century
By 1904, there were only 535 A'ani tribe members remaining. Since then, the tribe has revived, with a substantial increase in population.

21st century

In March 2012, 63 American bison from Yellowstone National Park were transferred to the Fort Peck Indian Reservation prairie, to be released to a 2,100-acre game preserve 25 miles north of Poplar.  There are many other bison herds outside Yellowstone, but this is one of the very few genetically pure ones, not cross-bred with cattle.  Native Americans celebrated the move, which came over a century after bison were nearly wiped out by hunters and the government. The Assiniboine and Gros Ventre tribes at the Fort Belknap Indian Reservation will also receive a portion of this herd.

Government
Historically, Gros Ventres had twelve independent bands, each governed by a chief. The current reservation government has an elected council, which includes four officers, as well as four members from each tribe. Today, the tribe belongs to the Fort Belknap Indian Community, whose constitution and by-laws were ratified in 1935. The tribal council has six elected Gros Ventre members, as well as six elected Assiniboine members, and three appointed members.

Notable Gros Ventre people
Theresa Lamebull (c. 1896–2007), fluent speaker of the Gros Ventre language
George Horse-Capture (1937–2013), anthropologist and author
James Welch (1940–2003), Blackfoot-Gros Ventre author
Jamie Fox,  Métis fiddler
Joseph P. Gone (1967- ), clinical and cultural psychologist

See also
 List of Native American peoples in the United States

Notes

References
 Pritzker, Barry M. A Native American Encyclopedia: History, Culture, and Peoples. Oxford: Oxford University Press, 2000.

External links

Fort Belknap Indian Reservation, official website
"Atsina", Lewis and Clark, National Geographic
Cultural Heritage of the Fort Belknap Indian Community
Sing an Owl Dance Song for George Chandler

 
Plains tribes
Native American history of Montana
Native American tribes in Montana